The Crkvenica is a Bosnian river. It is a right bank tributary of the Vrbanja River. 

The river is known for its water mills; during the 1950s, they numbered approximately 18.

The narrow area of its headwaters contains a watershed between the confluence of the Vrbas and the Bosna Rivers.

Tufa stećci on the Crkvenica riverbank is a relic of the Bogomil settlement in the twelfth century. The stećci was originally located at the confluence of the Crkvenica and the Vrbanja. The stones were quarried and built into the walls of the surrounding buildings, possibly due to belief in their miraculous properties. One of the most well-preserved tombstones is in its original location, submerged in the River Vrbanja.

References

Rivers of Bosnia and Herzegovina